Roshan Prince is an Indian singer, producer, musician, songwriter and actor known for his Punjabi-language Bhangra songs. In August 2021, Roshan begins shooting of his upcoming movie 13Teen.

Discography

Filmography

References

Place of birth missing (living people)
Year of birth missing (living people)
Living people
Bhangra (music) musicians
Indian male singer-songwriters
Indian singer-songwriters